De Cecco is a surname of Italian origin. Notable people with the surname include: 

 John Paul De Cecco (1925–2017), American academic
 Luciano De Cecco (born 1988), Argentine volleyball player
 Marcello De Cecco (1939–2016), Italian economist

Italian-language surnames